Danny Meyer (born 3 August 1986) is a former Australian rules football player who played for the Port Adelaide Football Club and Richmond Tigers.

AFL career

Richmond career (2005–2008)
Meyer was selected by Richmond with the twelfth selection in the 2004 AFL Draft from Glenelg in the SANFL.

Port Adelaide career (2009–2011)
In October 2008, he was delisted by Richmond after 17 games with the club.

Meyer was picked up by Port Adelaide Power in the 2008 draft

He announced his retirement from AFL  at the end of the 2011 season.

External links

Port Adelaide Football Club players
Port Adelaide Football Club players (all competitions)
Richmond Football Club players
Glenelg Football Club players
Living people
1986 births
Australian rules footballers from South Australia
Flagstaff Hill Football Club players
People educated at Sacred Heart College, Adelaide